Eugendorf is a market town of 6,439 inhabitants in the district of Salzburg-Umgebung in the state of Salzburg in Austria.

History

The town was first documented in the year 736.

Geography
Eugendorf is located about 10 kilometres to the northeast of Salzburg between the city and the Wallersee lake. The municipality borders with Seekirchen am Wallersee, Henndorf am Wallersee, Hallwang, Thalgau, Koppl and Thalgau. It is divided into 10 Ortschaften: the town of Eugendorf and 9 villages:

Transport
Eugendorf has a station on the international Westbahn Railway, that is also served by the Salzburg S-Bahn. It is also served by the A1 motorway at the exit "Wallersee-Eugendorf".

See also
Salzkammergut
Salzkammergut-Lokalbahn

References

External links

 Municipal site of Eugendorf
 Eugendorf on "Salzburg Wiki"

Cities and towns in Salzburg-Umgebung District